Fuchsia simplicicaulis is a species of shrub in the family Onagraceae. It is endemic to Peru. It's Herbaria type is electrotype MA 11/92 11.

References

Flora of Peru
simplicicaulis